Camp Kearny was a U.S. military base (first Army, later Navy) in San Diego County, California, on the site of the current Marine Corps Air Station Miramar. It operated from 1917 to 1946. The base was named in honor of Brigadier General Stephen W. Kearny.

History

Establishment and early years

The area included the  Miramar Ranch, which had originally been established by newspaperman E. W. Scripps and later sold to the Jessop family. It was Scripps who named the area Miramar, meaning "view of the sea".

The new base was named in honor of Brigadier General Stephen W. Kearny, a leader in the Mexican–American War who also served as a military governor of California. Camp Kearny was one of 32 new camps created by the Army in 1917 as a mobilization and training facility for troops on their way to battlegrounds of World War I. The first commander was Major James Stuart McKnight. Army aircraft occasionally landed on the parade ground, but an actual airfield was not established during World War I.

After the war, the camp was used as a demobilization center; Joseph E. Kuhn commanded the post until it was closed in 1920. It was largely abandoned after 1920 but was retained by the government for use as a military and civilian airfield. The U.S. Public Health Service used it for a time. In 1927 the Ryan Aircraft Company used the field to weight-test the plane The Spirit of St. Louis which they were then building for Charles A. Lindbergh. During 1929–1930 the facility was known as Airtech Field, operated by the San Diego Air Service Corp.

United States Navy use
In 1932 the Navy installed a mooring mast for helium dirigibles on the base. The Akron first visited Camp Kearny on 11 May 1932. That mooring ended in disaster when a gust of wind carried the airship upward, killing two ground handlers and injuring a third. However, the Navy continued to use the facility, and the Macon moored at Camp Kearny four times during 1934. The airships were homeported at Moffett Field in Sunnyvale, California, whose civic leaders had won a vigorous public relations battle with San Diego in the late 1920s to become the host of the Navy's airfield for dirigibles.

In 1940 the Navy began a series of projects to improve and expand Camp Kearny. On 20 February 1943, the area was commissioned as Naval Auxiliary Air Station Camp Kearny. (By then the misspelling "Kearney" had become so common that the base was actually commissioned as "NAAS Camp Kearney".) It had three runways: a  asphalt runway mainly used for aircraft parking, and two  concrete runways. The primary mission of the base was training pilots in the use of PB4Y Liberators (B-24s), which were built by the nearby Consolidated Aircraft Company.

United States Marine Corps use
In 1934 part of the base was leased to the Marine Corps to use for maneuvers and gunnery ranges. At the beginning of World War II the Marines took over the northern portion of Camp Kearny, which they christened Marine Corps Air Depot Camp Kearny. In 1943 the Marines changed their station name to Marine Corps Air Depot Miramar to avoid confusion with the Navy base. The Marine base was mainly used to process Marine squadrons en route to the South Pacific. At various times it was the headquarters of Marine Aircraft Group 11, Marine Aircraft Group 12, Marine Aircraft Group 13, Marine Aircraft Group 14, Marine Aircraft Group 15 and Marine Air Warning Group 2 (MAWG-2) before they deployed to the Pacific.

The Marines also developed a training base on the grounds of Camp Kearny called Camp Holcomb, named for Major-General Thomas Holcomb who was then commandant of the Marine Corps. By 1940 the number of volunteer recruits was overwhelming the local training base, Marine Corps Recruit Depot San Diego, so the Marines replaced Camp Holcomb with a much larger training base directly east of Camp Kearny which was called Camp Elliott, named for George F. Elliott, a former commandant of the Marine Corps.

After the end of the war, the Navy used Camp Kearny for demobilization. On 1 May 1946, the Navy departed Camp Kearny, handing it over to the Marines, and the station became MCAS Miramar. In 1947, the Marines moved to MCAS El Toro in Orange County, California, and Miramar was redesignated as a Naval Auxiliary Air Station, NAAS Miramar, followed by upgrade to full air station status as a Master Jet Base and renamed NAS Miramar. Miramar remains active in 2021, as home to the 3rd Marine Aircraft Wing, the aviation element of the 1st Marine Expeditionary Force.

Rosedale Naval Outlying Landing Field

Rosedale Naval Outlying Landing Field was built as Rosedale Field in 1938 just south of Camp Kearny. Rosedale Field was used for San Diego Naval Air Station's aircraft carrier plane high-altitude bombing, dive-bombing and strafing practice. Also for emergency landing activities. After the war in 1945, the Landing Field was abandoned and no trace remains.

See also
 California during World War II
 List of United States Marine Corps bases

References

20th century in San Diego
Installations of the United States Army in California
Military installations established in 1917
1917 establishments in California
Military installations closed in 1946
1946 disestablishments in California
Closed installations of the United States Navy 
Closed installations of the United States Army
California in World War II